In the study of artificial neural networks (ANNs), the neural tangent kernel (NTK) is a kernel that describes the evolution of deep artificial neural networks during their training by gradient descent. It allows ANNs to be studied using theoretical tools from kernel methods.

For most common neural network architectures, in the limit of large layer width the NTK becomes constant. This enables simple closed form statements to be made about neural network predictions, training dynamics, generalization, and loss surfaces. For example, it guarantees that wide enough ANNs converge to a global minimum when trained to minimize an empirical loss. The NTK of large width networks is also related to several other large width limits of neural networks.

The NTK was introduced in 2018 by Arthur Jacot, Franck Gabriel and Clément Hongler. It was implicit in contemporaneous work on overparameterization.

Definition

Scalar output case 
An ANN with scalar output consists of a family of functions  parametrized by a vector of parameters .

The NTK is a kernel  defined byIn the language of kernel methods, the NTK  is the kernel associated with the feature map .

Vector output case 
An ANN with vector output of size  consists in a family of functions  parametrized by a vector of parameters .

In this case, the NTK  is a matrix-valued kernel, with values in the space of  matrices, defined by

Derivation 
When optimizing the parameters  of an ANN to minimize an empirical loss through gradient descent, the NTK governs the dynamics of the ANN output function  throughout the training.

Scalar output case 
For a dataset  with scalar labels  and a loss function , the associated empirical loss, defined on functions , is given byWhen the ANN  is trained to fit the dataset (i.e. minimize ) via continuous-time gradient descent, the parameters  evolve through the ordinary differential equation:

During training the ANN output function follows an evolution differential equation given in terms of the NTK:

 

Vector output case 
For a dataset  with vector labels  and a loss function , the corresponding empirical loss on functions  is defined byThe training of  through continuous-time gradient descent yields the following evolution in function space driven by the NTK:

Interpretation 
The NTK  represents the influence of the loss gradient  with respect to example  on the evolution of ANN output  through a gradient descent step: in the scalar case, this readsIn particular, each data point  influences the evolution of the output  for each  throughout the training, in a way that is captured by the NTK .

Large-width limit 
Recent theoretical and empirical work in deep learning has shown the performance of ANNs to strictly improve as their layer widths grow larger. For various ANN architectures, the NTK yields precise insight into the training in this large-width regime.

Wide fully-connected ANNs have a deterministic NTK, which remains constant throughout training 
Consider an ANN with fully-connected layers  of widths , so that , where  is the composition of an affine transformation  with the pointwise application of a nonlinearity , where  parametrizes the maps . The parameters  are initialized randomly, in an independent, identically distributed way.

As the widths grow, the NTK's scale is affected by the exact parametrization of the 's and by the parameter initialization. This motivates the so-called NTK parametrization . This parametrization ensures that if the parameters  are initialized as standard normal variables, the NTK has a finite nontrivial limit. In the large-width limit, the NTK converges to a deterministic (non-random) limit , which stays constant in time.

where  denotes the kernel defined in terms of the Gaussian expectation:

In this formula the kernels  are the ANN's so-called activation kernels.

Wide fully connected networks are linear in their parameters throughout training 
The NTK describes the evolution of neural networks under gradient descent in function space. Dual to this perspective is an understanding of how neural networks evolve in parameter space, since the NTK is defined in terms of the gradient of the ANN's outputs with respect to its parameters. In the infinite width limit, the connection between these two perspectives becomes especially interesting. The NTK remaining constant throughout training at large widths co-occurs with the ANN being well described throughout training by its first order Taylor expansion around its parameters at initialization:

Other architectures 
The NTK can be studied for various ANN architectures, in particular convolutional neural networks (CNNs), recurrent neural networks (RNNs) and transformers. In such settings, the large-width limit corresponds to letting the number of parameters grow, while keeping the number of layers fixed: for CNNs, this involves letting the number of channels grow.

Applications

Convergence to a global minimum 
This positive-definiteness property has been shown in a number of cases, yielding the first proofs that large-width ANNs converge to global minima during training.

Kernel methods 
The NTK gives a rigorous connection between the inference performed by infinite-width ANNs and that performed by kernel methods: when the loss function is the least-squares loss, the inference performed by an ANN is in expectation equal to the kernel ridge regression (with zero ridge) with respect to the NTK . This suggests that the performance of large ANNs in the NTK parametrization can be replicated by kernel methods for suitably chosen kernels.

Software libraries 
Neural Tangents is a free and open-source Python library used for computing and doing inference with the infinite width NTK and neural network Gaussian process (NNGP) corresponding to various common ANN architectures.

References 

Kernel methods for machine learning

External links